Filipe Andrade Félix (born 7 February 1985), commonly known as Filipe, is a Brazilian former professional footballer who played as a defender. In December 2015, Filipe was awarded Polish citizenship.

Club career
Filipe spent most of his footballing career in Poland, representing Górnik Zabrze in the Ekstraklasa, before moving on to lower division sides.

In February 2015, Filipe left Górnik Wałbrzych. Later the same month, he signed with Swornica Czarnowąsy.

References

External links
 
 
 

Living people
1985 births
People from Ipatinga
Brazilian footballers
Association football defenders
CR Vasco da Gama players
Brescia Calcio players
Górnik Zabrze players
Zagłębie Lubin players
Odra Opole players
GKS Jastrzębie players
Czarni Żagań players
LZS Piotrówka players
Ekstraklasa players
I liga players
Brazilian expatriate footballers
Brazilian expatriate sportspeople in Poland
Expatriate footballers in Poland
Brazilian expatriate sportspeople in Germany
Expatriate footballers in Germany
Sportspeople from Minas Gerais